The Sardar Government Museum (also known as Jodhpur Government Museum, Jodhpur State Museum or Museum Jodhpur) is located in Public Park (Ummed Bagh), Jodhpur, Rajasthan, India. The museum is named after Sardar Singh, a maharaja of Jodhpur, and was constructed under the reign of his son, Maharaja Umed Singh. It was built by Henry Vaughan Lanchester in 1909 and formally opened to public on 17 March 1936. The area of the museum is approx. 18,000 sq.ft. On 22 June 2018, the re-planned museum was inaugurated by Smt. Vasundhara Raje, the Chief Minister of Rajasthan.

Collection
The current collection consist of: 
 397 stone sculptures
 10 inscriptions
 1951 miniature paintings
 12 terracotta
 32 metallic objects
 178 arms
 111,703 coins
 4107 miscellaneous objects

The museum is divided into four sections—the archaeological, armory, art and craft and historical sections. It is particularly rich in weapons, textiles, miniature portraits and local arts and crafts.

References

External links
Official Webpage

Museums in Rajasthan